Nancowry may refer to:
 Nancowry Island, one of India's Nicobar Islands
 Nancowry language, an Austroasiatic language spoken in the Nicobar Islands
 Nancowry tehsil, one of 2 local administrative divisions of the Indian district of Nicobar